A gatehouse is a type of building that stands at the gateway to a town, country estate, park, castle, or other fortification of importance.

Gatehouse or Gate House may also refer to:

Buildings 
 Gatehouse (waterworks), a building housing water control devices for a dam
 Gate House (Jupiter Island, Florida), a house in Florida, United States
 The Gatehouse, Baltonsborough, a house in Somerset, England
 The Gatehouse, Monmouth, a public house in Monmouthshire, Wales
 The Gatehouse, Norwich, a public house in Norfolk, England
 Gate House, Eskdale Green, a country house in Cumbria, England
 Gatehouse Prison, a former prison at Westminster Abbey in London, England
 Gatehouse School, an independent school in London, England
 Upstairs at The Gatehouse, a pub theatre in London, England

Companies and organisations 
 The Gatehouse (charity), a Canadian charity for victims of child abuse
 Gatehouse Bank, a UK bank based in London
 GateHouse Media, an American newspaper publisher
 GateHouse Group, a Denmark-based software company

Media 
 The Gate House, a 2008 novel by Nelson DeMille

People 
 Adam Gatehouse (born c. 1950), English conductor
 Alexander Gatehouse (1895–1964), British Army officer
 Angharad Gatehouse, entomologist
 Charles Gatehouse (1877–1924), American football player
 Gabriella Gatehouse (born 1994),  Brazilian-British model
 George Gatehouse (1864–1947), Australian cricketer
 James Gatehouse (1883–1949), Australian rules footballer
 Peter Gatehouse (born 1936), Welsh cricketer

Places 
 Gatehouse of Fleet, Dumfries and Galloway, Scotland

See also 
 Gatekeeper's lodge